Dmitry Chelovenko (born 3 April 1974) is a Russian ski jumper. He competed in the normal hill and large hill events at the 1994 Winter Olympics.

References

1974 births
Living people
Russian male ski jumpers
Olympic ski jumpers of Russia
Ski jumpers at the 1994 Winter Olympics
Sportspeople from Nizhny Novgorod